Marco Aulbach (born 25 July 1993) is a German footballer who last played as a goalkeeper for SG Bad Soden in the Verbandsliga Hessen-Nord.

References

External links
 
 
 Marco Aulbach at Fupa

1993 births
Living people
German footballers
Germany youth international footballers
Association football goalkeepers
Eintracht Frankfurt II players
Eintracht Frankfurt players
SV Wacker Burghausen players
SC Preußen Münster players
1. FSV Mainz 05 II players
FSV Frankfurt players
3. Liga players
Regionalliga players
People from Aschaffenburg
Sportspeople from Lower Franconia
Footballers from Bavaria